The St. Vincent and the Grenadines Public Service Union (PSU) is a trade union in Saint Vincent and the Grenadines.

References

Trade unions in Saint Vincent and the Grenadines
Public sector trade unions